Johann (John) Georg Hagen (March 6, 1847 – September 6, 1930) was an Austrian Jesuit priest and astronomer. After serving as Director of the Georgetown University Observatory he was called to Rome by Pope Pius X in 1906 to be the first Jesuit director of the new Vatican Observatory. Father Hagen was also the spiritual director of Maria Elizabeth Hesselblad (1870-1957), who was baptized by him on August 15, 1902 and eventually was canonized on June 5, 2016 by Pope Francis.

Early life
Johann Georg Hagen was born in Bregenz, Austria on 6 March 1847, the son of a school teacher.

Entering the Jesuit Order
Johann entered the Society of Jesus, commonly known as the Jesuits, in Gorheim, Germany in 1863.  He attended the Jesuit College Stella Matutina in Feldkirch, Austria and also studied mathematics and astronomy at the University of Bonn and the University of Münster.  He volunteered for the ambulance service in the Franco-Prussian War, but was struck with typhoid fever.

Expulsion
On July 4, 1872, Otto von Bismarck, chancellor of Germany, expelled the Jesuits from the German Empire.  Johann left for England where he was eventually ordained into the priesthood.

Emigration to US
In June 1880, he left England for the United States. There he began teaching at Sacred Heart College in Prairie du Chien, Wisconsin.  There he cultivated his interest in astronomy and built a small observatory for making astronomical observations.  In Wisconsin, he became a naturalized citizen.

He was called to serve as the Director of the Georgetown University Observatory in 1888.  There he continued his research and published numerous articles and texts. In mathematics, the Rothe–Hagen identity is named after him; it appears in his three-volume 1891 publication, Synopsis of Higher Mathematics.

He contributed several articles on astronomical topics to the Catholic Encyclopedia.

Vatican Observatory
In 1906, John was called by Pope Pius X to take charge of the Vatican Observatory in Rome.  He died in Rome on September 6, 1930.

The crater Hagen, 55 km in diameter, on the far side of the Moon is named after him.

Publications
{{cite book|title=Atlas Stellarum Variabilium (Atlas of variable stars)|date=1890–1908|location=Berlin|publisher=Felix L. Dames|language=Latin}}
with G. A. Fargis: 

See also

List of craters on the Moon, G-K
List of Roman Catholic scientist-clerics

ReferencesWisconsin Journal of History'', December 1941, page 180.

1847 births
1930 deaths
People from Bregenz
19th-century Austrian Jesuits
20th-century Austrian astronomers
Austro-Hungarian emigrants to the United States
University of Bonn alumni
Georgetown University faculty
Catholic clergy scientists
19th-century American Jesuits
20th-century American Jesuits
Jesuit scientists
Contributors to the Catholic Encyclopedia
19th-century Austrian astronomers